The 187th (2/3rd West Riding) Brigade was a formation of the Territorial Force of the British Army. It was assigned to the 62nd (2nd West Riding) Division and served on the Western Front during the First World War.

Formation
 2/4th Battalion, King's Own Yorkshire Light Infantry
 2/5th Battalion, King's Own Yorkshire Light Infantry
 2/4th Battalion, Yorks & Lancs Regiment 
 2/5th Battalion, Yorks & Lancs Regiment 
 208th Machine Gun Company, Machine Gun Corps
 187th Trench Mortar Battery

References

Infantry brigades of the British Army in World War I